Gyda Hansen (7 February 1938 – 20 August 2010) was a Danish film actress. She appeared in 22 films between 1963 and 2000.

Selected filmography 
 Støv for alle pengene (1963)
 Summer in Tyrol (1964)
 It's Nifty in the Navy (1965)

References

External links 
 
 

1938 births
2010 deaths
Danish film actresses
Actresses from Copenhagen
Deaths from cancer in Denmark